Likoni  is a division of Mombasa County, Kenya, and is located to the south-west of Mombasa Island.

Transport 

Likoni is the site of the southern terminus of the Likoni Ferry, a double ended ferry serving road traffic and pedestrians from both Likoni and Mombasa island.  Likoni also has a high concentration of Boda-boda services.  Matatus bound for the southern districts of Kenya use the Likoni Ferry to cross the Likoni Creek.

The Likoni Massacres 
In the autumn of 1997, six policemen were killed when local raiders armed with traditional weapons and guns rampaged through the area. A police station and outpost were destroyed, along with many market stalls and offices. Many non-local Kenyans were either killed or maimed, as the raiders targeted the Luo, Luhya, Kamba and Kikuyu communities.  It was estimated that ten police officers and thirty-seven raiders were killed in the clashes based on testimony to the Akiwumi Commission of Inquiry.  The remainder of fatalities were in the local community.

In popular culture
In the science fiction video game Halo 2, Likoni is the location of a 26th-century slum known as Old Mombasa. Although the area is heavily built-up with aging offices and apartments constructed centuries prior, the area also exhibits many examples of even older, more traditional Muslim and Portuguese architecture, a style modeled after Old Town Makadara on Mombasa Island.

References 

Populated places in Coast Province
Mombasa County
Mombasa